Kalia may refer to:

People
Kalia Davis (born 1998), American football player
Kalia Kulothungan (born 1977), Indian footballer 
Saurabh Kalia, India Army Officer (Kargil War)

Places

Kalia, Faranah, in Guinea
Kalia, Gaoual, in Guinea

Kalya, Israeli kibbutz and settlement in the West Bank

Kalia, Togo

Kalia Upazila

Others
 MV Kalia, a small double-hulled oil tanker
Kalia the Crow, a cartoon character in the popular Indian monthly comic Tinkle
Khanani and Kalia
Kalia (watercraft), the Tongan adaptation of a drua or double-hulled Polynesian watercraft
Elaeocarpus bifidus, a tree known by the common name kalia

See also

 Kaalia, a 1981 Bollywood film
 Kalia a 1984 Pakistani film